Etis was a town in the south of ancient Laconia, the inhabitants of which were removed to Boeae.

Its site is located near the modern Paleokastro.

References

Populated places in ancient Laconia
Former populated places in Greece